31 Persei is a single star in the northern constellation of Perseus. It is visible to the naked eye as a dim, blue-white hued point of light with an apparent visual magnitude of 5.05. It is a likely member of the Alpha Persei Cluster.

This object is a B-type main-sequence star with a stellar classification of B5V, a massive star that is currently generating energy through hydrogen fusion at its core. It is around 234 million years old and spinning rapidly with a projected rotational velocity of 260 km/s. The star has 4.6 times the mass of the Sun and about 3.4 times the Sun's radius. It is radiating 950 times the luminosity of the Sun from its photosphere at an effective temperature of 15,301 K.

References

B-type main-sequence stars
Alpha Persei Cluster

Perseus (constellation)
BD+49 902
Persei, 31
020418
015444
0989